DV8 Defenders is an American amateur soccer team based in Redwood City, California, United States. Founded in 1997, the team plays in Region IV of the United States Adult Soccer Association, a network of amateur leagues at the fifth tier of the American Soccer Pyramid.

The team plays its home games at Bechet Field in Red Morton Community Park. The team's colors are navy blue, black and white.

History
DV8 were formed in 1999, and have competed in the Peninsula Soccer League (PSL), the top amateur league in the Bay Area in Northern California. Since joining the league the team won the PSL Cup Championship in 2004, enjoyed a perfect 2006-07 campaign on their way to their first Peninsula Soccer League championship, and have also won competitions such as the Soccer United League in 2010.

DV8 entered the Lamar Hunt U.S. Open Cup for the first time in 2011, and qualified for the tournament proper at the first attempt, topping their qualifying group that included Albuquerque Metro SC from New Mexico and local rivals SF Italian AC. DV8 is one of the most known teams in the bay area and is considered the most active high level soccer team in the area. DV8 also has former professional players active on roster and has had players on the roster that are now playing professionally.

Players
Nor Cal League/Open cup 2014

Notable players

   Javier Hill Ayala
   Hunberto Alvarez
   Luke Sassano
   Paul Moran 
   Paulo Ferreira-Mendes
   Pedro Ferreira-Mendes
   Bryan Little

Head coaches
  Tono Aspinall (2010-2012)
   Jake Morrison 2012–present

Stadia
 Port Royal Park; Foster City, California (2004–2008)
 Fiesta Meadows Park; San Mateo, California (2004–2005) 2 games
 Stadium at San Mateo High School; San Mateo, California (2005–2009) 8 games
 McGarvey Field; Redwood City, California (2008–present)
 Andrew Hill Park; San Jose, California (2008) 1 game
 Mayfield Soccer Complex; Palo Alto, California (2008) 1 game
 Bechet Field in Red Morton Community Park; Redwood City, California (2009–present)

References

External links
 Official site

Soccer clubs in the San Francisco Bay Area